9 Cygni is a binary star system in the northern constellation of Cygnus. 9 Cygni is its Flamsteed designation. The two stars have a combined magnitude of 5.39, so it can be seen with the naked eye under good viewing conditions.

The two stars of 9 Cygni are a G-type giant and an A-type star. Both stars are over twice as massive as the Sun. However, the eccentricity is high, at 0.82. The primary is a red clump giant, a star on the cool end of the horizontal branch fusing helium in its core. The secondary star has begun to evolve off the main sequence; it is sometimes classified as a giant star and sometimes as a main-sequence star.

References

See also
 Spectroscopic binary

G-type giants
A-type main-sequence stars
Binary stars
Cygnus (constellation)
Durchmusterung objects
Cygni, 9
184759 
096302
7441